Majed Al-Mohammed (born 4 July 1986) is a Saudi football player.

References

1986 births
Living people
Saudi Arabian footballers
Al-Hamadah Club players
Najran SC players
Sdoos Club players
Al-Shoulla FC players
Saudi Second Division players
Saudi First Division League players
Saudi Professional League players
Saudi Fourth Division players
Association football fullbacks